The Ruby Group of two 600 ton Fourth Rate vessels were part of the 1651 Programme. They were the two larger vessels. Initially five vessels were specified, three of 410 tons at 6.10.0d per ton and two of 600 tons at £7.10.0d per ton. The size of these vessels grew from the 1647 predecessors with 600 tonners being much broader. The two 600-ton vessels would be completed as 42-gun Fourth Rates.

Design and specifications
The construction one  vessels was assigned to Portsmouth Dockyard with one vessel contracted to Peter Pett I of Ratcliffe. The dimensional data was so varied that it will be listed on the individual vessels along with their gun armament composition.

Ships of the 1651 Programme Group

Notes

Citations

References
 British Warships in the Age of Sail (1603 – 1714), by Rif Winfield, published by Seaforth Publishing, England © Rif Winfield 2009, EPUB , Chapter 4, The Fourth Rates - 'Small Ships', Vessels acquired from 24 March 1603, Ruby Group
 Ships of the Royal Navy, by J.J. Colledge, revised and updated by Lt-Cdr Ben Warlow and Steve Bush, published by Seaforth Publishing, Barnsley, Great Britain, © the estate of J.J. Colledge, Ben Warlow and Steve Bush 2020, EPUB 

 

Frigates of the Royal Navy
Ships of the Royal Navy
1650s ships